Pope Nicholas IV (r. 1288–1292) created six Cardinals in one consistory celebrated on 16 May 1288:

 Bernardo de Berardi (Berardus Calliensis), bishop of Osimo — cardinal-bishop of Palestrina, † 5 August 1291
 Hugh Aycelin, O.P. — cardinal-priest of S. Sabina, then cardinal-bishop of Ostia e Velletri (August 1294), † 28 December 1297
 Matteo de Acquasparta, O.F.M., minister general of his order — cardinal-priest of S. Lorenzo in Damaso, then cardinal-bishop of Porto e Santa Rufina (22 September 1291), † 28 October 1302
 Pietro Peregrosso, vice-chancellor of the Holy Roman Church — cardinal-deacon of S. Giorgio in Velabro, then cardinal-priest of S. Marco (18 December 1288), † 1 August 1295
 Napoleone Orsini Frangipani — cardinal-deacon of S. Adriano, † 23 March 1342
 Pietro Colonna — cardinal-deacon of S. Eustachio; deposed on 10 May 1297 by Pope Boniface VIII; restored by Clement V on 15 December 1305 as cardinal-deacon without a title; then cardinal-deacon of S. Angelo (2 March 1317), † 7 January 1326

Sources 
 Konrad Eubel: Hierarchia Catholica Medii Aevi, vol. 1, Münster 1913

Nicholas IV
College of Cardinals
Nic